Julius Natterer, (December 5, 1938 – October 25, 2021), was a German engineer and professor of wood construction at the Swiss Federal Institute of Technology in Lausanne.

Career 
Julius Natterer studied at the Technical University of Munich, where he graduated in 1965. He then stayed there for nine years as an assistant. During this time, he founded his own wood design office. In 1978, he was appointed to the Swiss Federal Institute of Technology in Lausanne. There he headed the timber construction laboratory (IBOIS / EPFL) which, according to the ideas of the university president, Maurice Cossandey, was to give a new impetus to timber construction in Switzerland.

Peer Haller, Professor from the Institute metal and timber construction at the University of Dresden University of Technology in Germany, says that he is one of the most important personalities in the field of timber construction. He is the designer of many new construction systems in solid wood and nailed planks. He is also known for the geodesic roofs he designed in wood, such as the Polydome at the EPFL in 1991 and the Expo in Hannover in 2000.
Julius Natterer, as a practitioner and teacher, quickly realised that structural wood engineering had to be taught in a mixed way to engineering and architecture students. To develop this ambition, he initiated a postgraduate course in wood engineering and architecture at EPFL in 1988 in collaboration with Professor Roland Schweitzer. A pioneer of this type of master's degree at EPFL, he joined forces with Professor Jean-Luc Sandoz, an engineer in wood materials and structures, to bring this training to an international level. 
This expert continued to share his passion for wood construction, long after his academic retirement in 2005.
Julius Natterer is regularly quoted as a reference by the generations that follow him, particularly during official presentations on sustainable development.

Prizes and honors 
 1976: German Metal Structure Prize
 1981: Mies van der Rohe Award European Union Prize for Contemporary Architecture
 1986: Medal of the Academy of Architecture
 1992: Member of the Royal Swedish Academy of Engineering Sciences chaired by Lena Treschow Torell
 1995: Ernst Pelz Prize and Merit Award in the USA
 1999: Bibliography of Swiss History 
 2002: World Award for Timber Structures in Malaysia
 2005: awarded the main prize of the Schweighofer Foundation
 2005: Designated Champion for the Earth by the community of Vaud for his valuable contribution to the preservation of the environment in the canton by the Athena Foundation and the Association pour le Développement du Nord Vaudois
 2012: Mr. Bois award 
 2018: At the 8th International Wood Construction Forum, he receives a tribute, alongside many of the engineers he has trained throughout his career, from all his peers, engineers and architects in wood construction

Books 
He is co-author of several world-class reference books on timber construction in several languages, including the EPFL's Atlas of Construction and Treatise on Civil Engineering, volume 13:
 Atlas of timber construction
 Traité de génie civil de l'EPFL, Volume 13, Construire en bois

Wooden structures 
 The Vallorbe bridge at Ballaigues, 1989
 Polydome EPFL, 1991
 Eine-Welt-Kirche, Schneverdingen, 1999
 Roof of the 2000 World Exhibition, Hanover 2000
 Sauvabelin Tower, Lausanne, 2003
 Wil Tower, St. Gallen, 2006
 Zenith, Limoges, 2007
 Luxembourg Pavilion at the Shanghai World Expo, 2010
 Construction of the roof of the Evangelical Free Church Christuskirche Heiligenstadt, 2011

References

External links 
 Website of the company Bois Consult Natterer - HOME

1938 births
2021 deaths
Sustainable development
Environmental issues with forests
École Polytechnique Fédérale de Lausanne alumni
German engineers
People from Straubing-Bogen